Marcel Jean Josse Lafortune (29 September 1900 – ?) was a Belgian rifle shooter who competed at four Olympic Games (1936, 1948, 1956, 1960). He was born in Leuven.

His best result was 8th at the 50m Free Pistol at the 1948 Olympics in London.

He came from a shooting family with sixteen Olympic appearances between them. His 1948 appearance at the Olympics was with his older brother, five-time Olympian François Lafortune, Sr. His 1956 appearance was with his nephew, seven-time Olympian François Lafortune, Jr. His 1960 appearance was with both François Lafortunes.

His other brother Hubert Lafortune was part of the Belgium gymnastics team that won silver at the 1920 Olympic Games.

References

1900 births
Year of death missing
Belgian male sport shooters
ISSF rifle shooters
ISSF pistol shooters
Olympic shooters of Belgium
Shooters at the 1936 Summer Olympics
Shooters at the 1948 Summer Olympics
Shooters at the 1956 Summer Olympics
Shooters at the 1960 Summer Olympics
Sportspeople from Leuven